Carla Bio Pattinasarany (born 9 August 2002) is an Indonesian footballer who plays a forward for Asprov DKI Jakarta and the Indonesia women's national team.

Club career
Bio has played for Asprov DKI Jakarta in Indonesia.

International career 
Bio represented Indonesia at the 2022 AFC Women's Asian Cup.

International goals

Honours

Club
PS Bangka
 Pertiwi Cup runner-up: 2021–22

References

External links

2002 births
Living people
Sportspeople from Jakarta
Indonesian women's footballers
Women's association football forwards
Indonesia women's international footballers